Romeo Cascarino (September 28, 1922 – January 8, 2002) was an American composer of classical music.

Cascarino was born in Philadelphia on September 28, 1922 and died in Norristown, Pennsylvania on January 8, 2002.  He graduated from South Philadelphia High School in June 1941. He served for many years as professor of music at the (now-defunct) Combs College of Music in Philadelphia, Pennsylvania. He received two Guggenheim Fellowships (in 1948 and 1949).

His music is generally tonal, and his magnum opus is the opera William Penn, whose life had fascinated Cascarino since childhood. The opera took him nearly 25 years to compose (from 1950 to 1975), and it was premiered in 1982 at the Academy of Music in Philadelphia with John Cheek of the Metropolitan Opera in the title role. 
CDs of his music have been released on Naxos featuring his Orchestral and Chamber Works with JoAnn Falletta conducting; 'Blades of Grass', for English Horn and String Orchestra was recorded on Innova with Orchestra 2001 conducted by James Freeman.  His works have been played by the Philadelphia Orchestra, the New Orleans Philharmonic, the Royal Philharmonic of London and the Nord Deutsches Symphony.  His ballets Pygmalion and Prospice were mounted in Philadelphia and New York.  In 1961 he arranged and conducted Pieces for Piano and Orchestra recorded in the cine Citta studios in Rome, Italy.  From 1950 to 1957, he was musical director of the Co-opera Company giving performances of rarely heard operas in English, the translations often done by Cascarino himself.

External links
Romeo Cascarino biography
Romeo Cascarino biography from Naxos site
Article about Romeo Cascarino
Article about Romeo Cascarino
William Penn opera site
Romeo Cascarino interview, May 28, 1988
South Philadelphia High School Alumni

1922 births
2002 deaths
20th-century classical composers
American male classical composers
American classical composers
Musicians from Philadelphia
20th-century American composers
Classical musicians from Pennsylvania
20th-century American male musicians